Ta'al (an acronym for) is an Israeli Arab political party in Israel led by Ahmad Tibi.

History
Ta'al was founded by Tibi in the mid-1990s. It ran in the 1996 elections under the name Arab Union, but won only 2,087 votes (0.1%). For the 1999 elections it ran as part of the Balad list. Tibi won a seat, and broke away from Balad on 21 December that year. In the 2003 elections the party ran on a joint list with Hadash, with Tibi retaining his seat.
On 7 February 2006 Tibi left the alliance with Hadash. For the 2006 elections the party ran on a joint list with the United Arab List, running as Ra'am–Ta'al (Ra'am is the Hebrew acronym for the UAL).
On 12 January 2009, the Ra'am–Ta'al list was disqualified from the 2009 elections by the Central Elections Committee. Twenty-one committee members voted in favor of its disqualification, with eight members voting against and two members abstaining. Tibi said the decision was related to Operation Cast Lead, claiming "this is a racist country. We are accustomed to these types of struggles and we will win" and that "this decision strives for a Knesset without Arabs that will only lead to the increased solidarity between the Arab public and its leadership". He said he would appeal to the Israeli High Court of Justice. On 21 January the High Court of Justice overturned the Committee's decision unanimously. Tibi welcomed the decision and said: "We have beaten fascism. This fight is over but the battle is not. Racism has become a trend in Israel ... the court's decision has righted a wrong by Kadima and Labor". The list won four seats, with Tibi retaining his place in the Knesset.

The party was part of the Joint List in the 2015 election, before it withdrew in January 2019, though it decided to rejoin the alliance for the September 2019 election and ran as part of it in the 2020 election as well. It left the alliance again on 28 January 2021, until it rejoined once again on 3 February.

Ideology
Ta'al supports an Israeli withdrawal to the pre-1967 green lines and a two-state solution, with a Palestinian state established alongside Israel in the West Bank and Gaza Strip. 

Ta'al has been often described as secular. Despite this the party was an ally of the Islamist United Arab List (Ra'am) and ran on their list between 2006 and 2015. Additionally their leader Tibi has been heavily criticized for homophobic comments in 2019.

The party is described as (Arab) nationalist but more moderate compared to Balad.

References

External links
Ta'al Knesset website

Anti-racism in Israel
Anti-Zionism in Israel
Arab nationalism in Israel
Arab nationalist political parties
Arab political parties in Israel
Political parties in Israel
Secularism in Israel
Anti-Zionist political parties